The 1940 Georgia Teachers Blue Tide football team represented the Georgia Teachers College—now known as Georgia Southern University—during the 1940 college football season. The team was led by Crook Smith in his 12th year as head coach.

Schedule

References

Georgia Teachers
Georgia Southern Eagles football seasons
Georgia Teachers Blue Tide football